Jackie Chambers (born September 8, 1984 in Miami, Florida) is a professional Arena football wide receiver who is currently a free agent. He was signed by the Stampeders as a street free agent in 2009. He played college football for the Lane Dragons.

Early life
Chambers attended Miami Edison High School in Miami, Florida, where he was named a Class 5A All State First-Team selection as a senior in 2004.

College career
Chambers began his college career at the University of South Florida. As a senior, Chambers played at Lane College, where he was named First-Team All-Southern Intercollegiate Athletic Conference (SIAC) as a kick returner, and Second-Team All-SIAC as a wide receiver.

Professional career
On April 30, 2015, Chambers was assigned to the New Orleans VooDoo. He was placed on reassignment on July 28, 2015.

References

External links
South Florida Bulls bio
Calgary Stampeders bio

1984 births
Living people
Miami Edison Senior High School alumni
Players of American football from Miami
American football wide receivers
American players of Canadian football
Canadian football wide receivers
South Florida Bulls football players
Lane Dragons football players
Calgary Stampeders players
Kansas City Command players
Philadelphia Soul players
Spokane Shock players
Tri-Cities Fever players
Cleveland Gladiators players
New Orleans VooDoo players
Players of Canadian football from Miami